Linda S. MacLennan (born May 25, 1956) is a former television news anchor and reporter who spent the majority of her career with WBBM-TV in Chicago, Illinois.

Early life and education 
Born in Toronto, Ontario, Canada, MacLennan is the daughter of a Canadian father and an American mother.  She earned a degree from Carleton University in Ottawa, Ontario.

Professional career 
MacLennan originally had planned to pursue a career in print journalism but switched to broadcasting after a college internship at CJOH-TV in Ottawa, Ontario. MacLennan co-anchored Canada AM on CTV from 1985 to 1987.

In 1986, MacLennan was struck by a policeman on a motorcycle in Toronto and developed a blood clot on the brain.  After doctors failed in their efforts to dissolve the blood clot with drugs, they operated on her at substantial risk to her.  She eventually made a full recovery.

In March 1987, MacLennan left CTV to join WBBM-TV in Chicago as a reporter and late afternoon co-anchor.  In April 1989, MacLennan became WBBM-TV's 10 p.m. co-anchor, replacing Walter Jacobson in the anchor chair alongside Bill Kurtis.  Jacobson had been the station's 10 p.m. co-anchor since 1973.

In 1995, Kurtis stepped down as WBBM's 10 p.m. co-anchor, and Lester Holt was promoted to replace Kurtis alongside MacLennan.

In 1996, MacLennan appeared on the pilot episode of Early Edition as a newscaster.

In February 2000, MacLennan was demoted as WBBM's 10 p.m. co-anchor as both she and Holt were demoted in favor of a solo anchor experiment involving Carol Marin.  After station bosses pulled the plug on Marin as solo anchor in October 2000, WBBM then made MacLennan an interim 10 p.m. co-anchor, alongside David Kerley.  However, in December 2000, WBBM hired Tracy Townsend as a 10 p.m. co-anchor alongside Kerley, and MacLennan shifted to being a solo 11 a.m. news anchor (replacing Jay Levine and Mary Ann Childers) and a 4:30 p.m. co-anchor alongside Vince Gerasole.  In 2001, MacLennan got a co-anchor for the 11 a.m. newscast, Michael Ayala.

In April 2002, MacLennan again returned to co-anchoring the 10 p.m. news, this time supplanting Townsend alongside the newly hired Antonio Mora.

With a new general manager, Joe Ahern, on board, MacLennan abruptly took a contract buyout from WBBM in February 2003.

As of June 2017, MacLennan became a part-time anchor for WBBM-AM in Chicago.

Personal 
In August 1992, MacLennan married Chicago attorney David Rammelt.  They have three children: Taylor Albert, Carson Charles and Charlotte Grace Nelson Rammelt.  The couple divorced in 2014.  She lives in Kenilworth, Illinois.

In October 2008, MacLennan was knocked to the ground after confronting a man suspected of breaking into cars in the parking lot of a Skokie, Illinois shopping mall, including her own vehicle.

References 

Living people
Television anchors from Chicago
American television reporters and correspondents
1956 births
Journalists from Toronto
American people of Canadian descent
Carleton University alumni
Canadian television news anchors
Canadian women journalists
CTV Television Network people
American women television journalists
21st-century American women